Lake Scranton is a reservoir in Lackawanna County, Pennsylvania, with a  running track surrounding it. Lake Scranton is a reservoir built with a dam in the early 1900s. The reservoir borders East Mountain in Scranton, Pennsylvania.

Lake Scranton is owned by the Pennsylvania American Water Company which supplies the city with drinking water. The reservoir formed by the dam built by William Walker Scranton in 1898 was called the "Burned Bridge Reservoir", though the public called the lake "Lake Scranton".

Lake Scranton is mentioned in two episodes of The Office: Beach Games and Dunder Mifflin Infinity. The Beach Games episode was shot at a fake beach near Hansen Dam, California.

References

https://www.lake-link.com/pennsylvania-lakes/lackawanna-county/lake-scranton/33284/

Scranton, Pennsylvania
Scranton